Namrata Purohit (born 24 August 1993) is an Indian Pilates instructor, who co-founded The Pilates Studio with her father Samir Purohit. At 16, she became the youngest trained Stott Pilates instructor in the world, and by 19 she had completed all the courses on Stott Pilates. Her clients include Bollywood celebrities, athletes and other public figures. She also authored a book, The Lazy Girl’s Guide to Being Fit.

Early life
Purohit's father Samir Purohit is a celebrity fitness expert and co-founder of The Pilates Studio. Born in Mumbai, India, Namrata completed her Major in economics at Jai Hind College and her Master’s of Science in Sports Management at Loughborough University. She was a national-level squash player and state-level football player. When she was 16, Purohit fell off a horse and had to undergo a knee surgery that ended her sporting career in squash.

Pilates career
After her surgery, under her father’s advice, she started practicing Pilates. She then went on to study courses on Pilates from Lindsay G. Merrithew. She became the youngest certified Stott Pilates instructor in the world and is also a certified Barre instructor. She consequently founded The Pilates Studio with her father, the first Pilates studio to offer both pilates and a simulated altitude training room.

At 21, she launched her first book, The Lazy Girl's Guide to Being Fit, published by Penguin Random House. She has trained celebrities including Kangana Ranaut, Jacqueline Fernandez, Varun Dhawan, Arjun Kapoor, Aditya Roy Kapur, Nargis Fakhri, Neha Dhupia, Lauren Gottlieb, Shibani Dandekar, Kareena Kapoor Khan, Elli Avram, Bruna Abdullah and Malaika Arora.

She was the official fitness partner to the Femina Miss India Organization (since 2011) and Miss Diva (2013 and 2014). Along with her father, Purohit was the official Pilates coach to the 2014 Mumbai City FC team.

References

1993 births
Living people
Alumni of Loughborough University